Mountain Strawberries 4, (산딸기 4 - Sanddalgi 4) also known as Wild Strawberries 4, is a 1991 South Korean film directed by Kim Su-hyeong. It was the fourth entry in the Mountain Strawberries series.

Synopsis
In 1950 an unsatisfied widow makes her living selling medicine from village to village while  searching for an energetic man to wed. She meets a strong but unintelligent man who works on a boat and wrestles and plays the drum in his spare time. After living with him happily for a short time and bearing him a daughter, the widow's unsatisfied spirit leads her astray. Years later she secretly watches her daughter's wedding, and leaves, beating a drum.

Cast
 Gang Hye-ji
 Yu Jang-hyeon
 Cho Ju-mi
 Kim Kuk-hyeon
 Kook Jong-hwan
 Chung Kyoo-young
 Ju Sang-ho
 Han Tae-il
 Yoo Myeong-sun
 Pak Yae-sook

Bibliography

English

Korean

Notes

1991 films
South Korean erotic films
1990s Korean-language films
South Korean sequel films